Elisabeth Östberg (born 29 August 1940) is a retired Swedish sprinter. She won national titles in the 400 m (1959, 1961 and 1964–65), 800 m (1961) and 4 × 400 m relay (11 times) and held the national record over 800 m. Östberg was part of the Swedish 4 × 400 m relay team that placed sixth at the 1969 European Championships. After retiring from competitions she worked as a coach, in Sweden and abroad.

References

Swedish female sprinters
Swedish female middle-distance runners
Universiade medalists in athletics (track and field)
1940 births
Living people
Universiade gold medalists for Sweden
Universiade bronze medalists for Sweden
Medalists at the 1967 Summer Universiade
Swedish Athletics Championships winners
Swedish athletics coaches
20th-century Swedish women